The National Democratic Entente (END) was a political party in Monaco led by Louis Aureglia.

History
The END won 7 of the 18 seats in the National Council in the 1958 elections. In 1962 it merged with the National Union of Independents to form the National Democratic Union, which won 17 seats in the 1963 elections.

References

Defunct political parties in Monaco
Monarchist parties in Monaco
Political parties disestablished in 1962